Appsbar is a tool to build and publish apps  for use on smartphones  and tablet  devices.

Overview 
Appsbar beta was introduced on April 28, 2011.

Appsbar offers one platform where a PC can be used to create and submit apps for smart phones to popular app stores, including iTunes and Google Play. This platform guides users through the process to create, edit and publish apps that are customized by choosing background colors and fonts, as well as add photos and videos from personal libraries or the tool's clip art library. Small businesses can sell their merchandise using PayPal.

As of June, 2012 Appsbar reported that more than 125,000 people had used its product, and its apps have been downloaded more than 12 million times.

Background 
Appsbar was introduced as a tool that gives anyone from the tech expert to a beginner an outlet to build relatively professional, customized apps.

Appsbar can be used on the web for Mobile application development. Appsbar apps are automatically optimized for use on smartphones developed by Android. Through its HTML5 Web application, Appsbar supports app designs for use on BlackBerry or Windows devices as well as Facebook. 

This desktop design solution allows an app builder to create, save and edit an unlimited number of apps. Appsbar uses a “wizard” to build apps for the app stores including iTunes and Android Market.  The software uses proprietary filters throughout the creation process so builders know immediately if they are adding (or not adding) details that would prevent the app from being published. 

App builders can also combine limitless combinations of existing technologies used to build professional apps. For example, appsbar is the first app builder to offer an "event notifier" function that delivers real-time or scheduled notifications to app users, and a menu feature that allows the end user to catalog products or services – tools for friends and businesses and their customers to have two-way communication.

Each app that appsbar submits to an app store is first reviewed by an "app coach"—an experienced developer (software) who tests each app during the submission process. This "app coach" is listed on the app as the developer. Appsbar lets each builder name their app. Anyone who downloads an app will know who built it.
	
Appsbar was developed by Appsbar Inc., a company co-founded by Scott Hirsch and Arsen Pereymer. Hirsch is also the co-founder of technology companies DigDev and DigDev Direct, an online and mobile direct marketing agency. 

Appsbar won the 10th Annual American Business Awards' 2012 People's Choice Stevie Award for Favorite New Media Entertainment Product., as well as the Best New Tech Company of the Year Gold Stevie Award.

References

External links 
 Appsbar

Mobile software